The 1960 United States presidential election in Montana took place on November 8, 1960, as part of the 1960 United States presidential election. Voters chose four representatives, or electors to the Electoral College, who voted for president and vice president.

Montana narrowly voted for the Republican nominee, Vice President Richard Nixon, over the Democratic nominee, Massachusetts Senator John F. Kennedy. Nixon won Montana by a slim margin of 2.50%. Kennedy thus became the first Democrat to win the White House without carrying Montana since Grover Cleveland in 1892, as well as the first ever Democrat to do so without carrying Carter, Liberty, Phillips, Richland, or Sanders Counties, the first to do so without carrying Fergus or Jefferson Counties since Cleveland in 1892, and the first to do so without carrying Custer, Missoula or Musselshell Counties since Woodrow Wilson in 1912. This is the first time since 1900 in which Montana would vote for the losing candidate in a presidential election.

Results

Results by county

See also
 United States presidential elections in Montana

References

Montana
1960
1960 Montana elections